Johanna Rika Hermanna "Hanja" Maij-Weggen (born 29 December 1943) is a retired Dutch politician of the Christian Democratic Appeal (CDA).

Political career 
From 1989 until 1994 she was Minister of Transport, Public Works and Water Management in the third cabinet of prime minister Ruud Lubbers, and from 2003 until 2009 the Queen's Commissioner of the province of North Brabant. After a nursing education from 1962 until 1965 she studied Pedagogy and History of Art at the University of Amsterdam until 1971. In 1967, she started working as a healthcare teacher in Amstelveen and Apeldoorn. In 1979, her political career started when she became a member of the European Parliament. In 1989, she temporarily left the European Parliament to become the Dutch Minister of Transport, Public Works and Water Management. Four years later, she returned to the European Parliament where she remained until 1 October 2003 when she became the Queen's Commissioner for the province of North Brabant. She retired on 1 October 2009.

Personal life 
She is the mother of CDA politician Hester Maij and PvdA MP Marit Maij. she was the president of World Animal Protection from 2000 until 2012.

Decorations

References

External links

Official
  J.R.H. (Hanja) Maij-Weggen Parlement & Politiek

 
 

1943 births
Living people
Anti-Revolutionary Party MEPs
Anti-Revolutionary Party politicians
Christian Democratic Appeal MEPs
Christian Democratic Appeal politicians
Commanders of the Order of Orange-Nassau
Dutch corporate directors
Dutch nonprofit directors
Dutch nonprofit executives
Dutch nurses
Dutch lobbyists
King's and Queen's Commissioners of North Brabant
Knights of the Order of the Netherlands Lion
MEPs for the Netherlands 1979–1984
MEPs for the Netherlands 1984–1989
MEPs for the Netherlands 1989–1994
MEPs for the Netherlands 1994–1999
MEPs for the Netherlands 1999–2004
20th-century women MEPs for the Netherlands
21st-century women MEPs for the Netherlands
Ministers of Transport and Water Management of the Netherlands
People from Emmen, Netherlands
Protestant Church Christians from the Netherlands
Reformed Churches Christians from the Netherlands
University of Amsterdam alumni
Women government ministers of the Netherlands
20th-century Dutch educators
Women King's and Queen's Commissioners of the Netherlands